The seventeenth season of American Idol premiered on March 3, 2019 on the ABC television network. It is the show's second season to air on ABC. Ryan Seacrest continues his role as the show's host, while Katy Perry, Luke Bryan and Lionel Richie returned for their second season as judges. Bobby Bones returned as the in-house mentor, and acted as guest host for the taped April 8, 2019 episode.

Laine Hardy from Livingston, Louisiana, won the season on May 19, 2019, while Alejandro Aranda was the runner-up, and Madison VanDenburg finished in third place. Hardy, who was cut at the Top 50 in season 16, became the third returning contestant to win, after Candice Glover in season 12 and Caleb Johnson in season 13.

Regional auditions
American Idol announced in June 2018 that 20 cities would be visited by the Idol bus, beginning with Orlando, Florida and San Diego, California on August 25. Auditions may also be submitted on the official website, or on Instagram, Facebook, Twitter and TikTok. During the 2018 CMA Awards, three contestants who didn't enter the competition and didn't audition initially, were given a chance to enter the competition. The contestants were Cameron Lenz, Natalee Spiroff, and Meghan Woods. The winner of that vote was revealed to be Meghan Woods on Good Morning America on November 16, 2018. However, Meghan Woods wasn't shown in any episode.

Hollywood Week

Hollywood Week aired over two episodes on March 24 and 25 at the Orpheum Theater. It featured three rounds: Lines of Ten, Group Round and Solo Round. In the first round, each contestant sang individually, and after ten sang, they gathered in a line. Those who impressed the judges advanced to the next round where the contestants perform in groups of three to five people, singing a song together. The remaining auditionees who passed through the group rounds performed their final solos to advance to the showcase round, held in Hawaii.

Showcase Round
The Showcase Round aired on March 31, which featured the top 40 performing for the judges and a live audience at Aulani, a Disney Resort & Spa in Ko Olina, Hawaii. The following day, the judges narrowed the number of contestants down from 40 to 20 in the Final Judgement.
The following is a list of the contestants who performed, the song they performed at the Showcase, and whether or not they made the Top 20:

Color key:

Top 20
The Top 20 performed at Wiltern Theatre in Los Angeles, California, and solo performances aired in one episode on April 1.

Solos (April 1)

All-Star Duets (April 7 & 8)
For All-Star Duets, contestants were split into two groups of ten. The first group aired on April 7 and the second group on April 8. After each contestant performed their duets, the judges selected seven contestants from each group to advance to the Top 14. Idol contestants were paired with celebrity singers as their duet partners. The artists who duetted with the first group included Jason Mraz, Brett Young, Shaggy, Pat Benatar & Neil Giraldo, and Elle King. The artists who duetted with the second group included Cynthia Erivo, Lukas Graham, Julia Michaels, Ben Harper, Lovelytheband, and Chris Isaak.

Bobby Bones served as a guest host for the April 8 episode filling in for Seacrest who missed the taping due to illness.

Color key:

Top 14 (April 14 and 15)
The Top 14 performances were taped on April 12, 2019, and aired on Sunday, April 14, followed with the live results on Monday, April 15, 2019.

Color key:

Live shows
Color key:

Week 1: Top 10 – Disney Night (April 21)
The Top 10 performed Disney songs on Sunday, April 21, 2019. Rebel Wilson served as a guest mentor.

Week 2: Top 8 – Queen Night / Movie Duets (April 28)
Adam Lambert served as a guest mentor, and all the top eight members sang  Queen songs. All eight remaining contestants also paired as a duet and sang songs from a movie soundtrack.

Week 3: Top 6 - Woodstock / Showstoppers (May 5)
The remaining six contestants were asked to sing a song that from Woodstock Festival in 1969 and songs that inspired them, and American contemporary Christian singer/songwriter, Lauren Daigle was as guest mentor for this week.

Week 4: Top 5 - Elton John / Bobby Bones' Choice / Hero Dedications (May 12)
This week, each contestant performed three songs: a pick from in-house mentor, Bobby Bones; a song dedicated to their heroes; and a selection from Elton John's catalog.

Week 5: Finale (May 19)
This week, the Top 3 performed their two songs, one contestant was eliminated landing in 3rd place, based on the results up to that point. Voting continued for the remaining two contestants and closed after the two finalists sang their last songs.

Color key:

Elimination chart 
Color key

Top 10 Contestants
 Laine Hardy (born September 12, 2000) is from Livingston, Louisiana. Raised in bayou area near Baton Rouge, Laine started taking music lessons when he was 7 and playing local gigs at 14. Although initially he did not sing, he was encouraged by his brother to sing. Laine Hardy first auditioned for season 16 of American Idol after his mother urged him to try, but did not go far in that season, making it only to the top 50. He sang "The Weight" and got the Golden Ticket. During the Hollywood week, he perform "She Talks to Angels" and "Proud Mary" for solo performances, "Grenade" for group performance. After giving a performance of "Come Together" during Showcase Round in Hawaii, he advanced to the Top 20. This time he made it to the final and won the competition. During the Finale, Laine sang "Home" by Marc Broussard, "Jambalaya (On the Bayou)" by Hank Williams and "Bring It On Home to Me" by Sam Cooke. He was announced as the winner on May 19. His coronation song "Flame" was released after the Finale and was performed after he was crowned American Idol.
 Alejandro Aranda (born August 11, 1994) is from Pomona, California. Alejandro always looked up to his older sister when she played classical music on the piano. That got him into classical music, and then he ventured out to the library to listen to music. He picked up the guitar later in life.   His interest continued through his teenage years but he did not become serious about being a musician until he was 20. Alejandro auditioned in Los Angeles. He sang two original songs, one called "Out Loud" on the guitar and another called "Cholo Love" on the piano. During Hollywood Week, he was shown in the same Group of Ten as Laci Kaye Booth, he sang Sorry by Justin Bieber. For his final solo performance, he sang an original song called "Ten Years" and advanced to the Top 40. For the Finale, Alejandro sang three of his own songs. He was announced as runner-up on May 19.
 Madison VanDenburg (born December 9, 2001) is from Cohoes, New York. Madison considers her first introduction to music the piano lessons she took when she was six years old. She started a duo next year with her older sister Taylor at her dad's restaurant and gigged around her hometown since then. Her piano teacher suggested she should try out for Idol. Auditioning in New York, the 17-year-old sang Dan + Shay’s Speechless.  Madison sang Who's Lovin' You for Showcase Round and advanced to the Top 20. After singing Shallow by Lady Gaga & Bradley Cooper and Breakaway by Kelly Clarkson during the Finale, finishing in third place on May 19.
 Laci Kaye Booth (born August 28, 1995) is from Livingston, Texas. Born the daughter of Texas country singer Jody Booth, her earliest musical memory is singing along with him at age three when he was sitting on the living room couch, playing his guitar. Soon after, her parents divorced and eventually, her father passed along his collection of LPs to his daughter. She was eight years old when she figured out that singing is what she really wanted to do. Laci sang Mama Tried by Merle Haggard during her audition in Denver. During the first part of Hollywood Week, she sang (You Make Me Feel Like) A Natural Woman by Aretha Franklin. She was later shown in a group called "Diamond Dixies" along with Katie Belle, Laine Hardy and Colby Swift singing "Grenade" by Bruno Mars. For her final solo performance, she sang "Stars" by Grace Potter and the Nocturnals. Laci sang "Georgia on My Mind" by Ray Charles during Showcase Round to earn her spot in the Top 20. She was controversially saved by the judges on the Top 6 Live Show and eliminated next week, along with Wade Cota, tied at fourth-fifth place.
 Wade Cota (born August 26, 1991) is from Phoenix, Arizona. Wade never took a lesson for guitar or for vocals. He self-taught and considered it as an escape. For one semester in eighth grade, Wade sang in his school choir. Then he went in a different direction with metal music. His first time playing in front of an audience was a music festival called the Way Out West Metal Fest. Wade first auditioned for Idol nine years ago, right after he graduated from high school. He failed to receive a "yes" that made him quit metal. Wade auditioned for this Idol season in Los Angeles. He sang Blame it On Me by George Ezra. During the Hollywood Week. he sang "Litost" by X Ambassadors and an original song named "Stay" for solo rounds. He was shown in a group singing California Dreamin' by The Mamas and the Papas and advanced despite forgetting the lyrics. Wade made it to the Top 5. He, along with Laci Kaye Booth received the lowest number of votes for that week, eliminating him from the competition at fourth-fifth place.
 Jeremiah Lloyd Harmon (born October 9, 1992) is from Catonsville, Maryland. Jeremiah's earliest childhood memory of music is singing in church with his mother and the rest of his siblings. Despite that early start and the fact that he always enjoyed singing, Harmon did not think about a musical career path until years later. He was one of this season's most compelling singers and stories. A pastor's son, he came out to his parents but they were not immediately accepting. Supported at his audition and on subsequent episodes by his boyfriend John. He auditioned in New York with an original song called "Almost Like Heaven”. He gave an emotional performance during Hollywood week with Beautiful by Carole King and The First Time Ever I Saw Your Face by Roberta Flack for solo rounds, then made it to the Top 40. His performed Elton John's "We All Fall in Love Sometimes" during Top 14 Show. For Top 6 Live Show, Jeremiah sang Swing Low, Sweet Chariot by Joan Baez and Somewhere from the 1957 Broadway musical West Side Story. He was placed in the Bottom 2 for that week, and the judges chose to save Laci Kaye Booth over him, eliminating him from the competition at sixth place.
 Walker Burroughs (born September 29, 1998) is a Belmont University student from Birmingham, Alabama but originally from Louisville, Kentucky. Walker had participated in church choir since elementary school, wrote his first song when he was in fifth grade and joined the band in middle school, continuing with choir and band in high school. He auditioned in Louisville with "Love Like This" by Ben Rector and "Hello" by Lionel Richie. During the Hollywood Week, he sang "Whereabouts" by Stevie Wonder and "Your Song" by Elton John for his first round and his final solo performance. After performing Youngblood by 5 Seconds of Summer, Walker advanced to the Top 20. During the Top 8 Live Show, Walker sang Crazy Little Thing Called Love by Queen and Mrs. Robinson in a duet with Alejandro Aranda. He is one of two who had the lowest number of votes. He was eliminated on April 28, along with Alyssa Raghu, tied at seventh-eighth place. 
 Alyssa Raghu (born March 2, 2002 as Alyssa Raghunandan) is from Orlando, Florida. Growing up with two different cultures, hearing Indian music in the house and then also hearing Mexican music in the house in Spanish, gave her a lot of perspective that there are so many things to listen to. Alyssa took guitar lessons for a short period of time. Alyssa auditioned for Idol's first season on ABC and made it through until got cut at Top 24. She took several classes to improve skills and then auditioned again this season in Los Angeles with the song Shark in the Water by V.V. Brown. Alyssa was shown in the third part of Hollywood Week, singing What About Us by P!nk for her final solo performance and advanced to Top 40. This time, she made to the Top 8, after she got a wild card by Katy Perry at the end of Top 14. For Top 8 Live Show, she sang Somebody to Love by Queen and Ain't No Mountain High Enough in a duet with Wade Cota. She, along with Walker Burroughs, received the lowest number of votes for that week, and the judges chose not to use their save, eliminating her from the competition at seventh-eighth place.
 Dimitrius Graham (born June 8, 1991) is from Baltimore, Maryland. Dimitrius's earliest memory of music is his mother singing a gospel song at church. He joined the children's choir of the church and performed his first solo with ‘The Shepherd’s Song’. He considered following in his stepfather's career path as a police officer and thought about becoming a teacher. A mentor later introduced him to opera and gave him secret lessons. Once he got a chance to see Pavarotti and Renée Fleming conquer an entire orchestra, he fell in love with their music. Dimitrius was first shown in the first solo round of Hollywood Week. He sang Wind Beneath My Wings by Bette Midler in front of the judges and his mother (via phone), who was about to have an operation. Then he appeared in a group called "Unexpected Vibe" singing I Want It That Way by Backstreet Boys. He advanced to the Top 10. Dimitrius sang You'll Be in My Heart by Phil Collins for the Disney Night Live Show. He is one of two who received the lowest number of votes, and the judges chose not to save him, eliminating him from the competition at ninth-tenth place.
 Uché (born July 15, 1994 as Uchechukwu Walter Ndubizu-Egwim-Okoli) is from Sugarland, Texas. As a child, Uché visited family in Nigeria and learned how to dance from his aunts and uncles. He had an epiphany while watching the Disney TV movie High School Musical when he was 11. He begged his parents to sign him up for an acting class. After living in Minnesota for ten years, his family moved back to Houston when he was 16. He auditioned for a musical named "The Music Man" and tried out for varsity choir at the same time. Later, he became the lead singer of the youth group band in his church. Uché graduated from Texas State with a degree in psychology. He went before the Idol judges with his rendition of Ain't No Other Man, and he sang Smokie Norful's "God Is Able" and talked about his musical influences. Uché was shown in the third part of Hollywood Week, singing Scars to Your Beautiful by Alessia Cara for his final solo performance. Uché sang "Eye to Eye"  from A Goofy Movie for the Disney Night Live Show. He is one of two who received the lowest number of votes, and the judges chose not to save him, eliminating him from the competition at ninth-tenth place.

Ratings

References

External links

American Idol seasons
2019 American television seasons